Sir Leslie Fowden (13 October 1925—16 December 2008) was a British organic chemist and plant scientist, notable for his pioneering research on phytochemistry and plant amino acids, as well as for his role in promoting agricultural research in the UK.

Life 
He undertook his BSc and PhD degrees as UCL's Department of Chemistry, before moving to the Department of Botany where he worked from 1950 to 1973.

From 1973 to 1988 he was Director of the Rothamsted Experimental Station (now Rothamsted Research).

He was elected Fellow of the Royal Society in 1964, and was awarded a Knighthood in 1982.

References

1925 births
2008 deaths
Alumni of University College London
British chemists
Organic chemists
Rothamsted Experimental Station people
Royal Society of Chemistry
Fellows of the Royal Society
Knights Bachelor